Peter Norman Vickery  (1949/1950 – 26 April 2022) was an Australian judge. He was a Trials Division justice at the Supreme Court of Victoria and sat as a judge of the Commercial Court for Victoria. Prior to his appointment, Vickery was an international human rights lawyer and also taught at La Trobe University.

References

20th-century births
2022 deaths
Australian King's Counsel
Human rights lawyers
Judges of the Supreme Court of Victoria
Academic staff of La Trobe University
Year of birth missing